Ozinki is an urban locality (an urban-type settlement) in Ozinsky District of Saratov Oblast, Russia. Population:  It is located adjacent to the Kazakhstan–Russia border.

References

Urban-type settlements in Saratov Oblast